Kakimoto Dam is a gravity dam located in Yamanashi Prefecture in Japan. The dam is used for power production. The catchment area of the dam is 33.6 km2. The dam impounds about 42  ha of land when full and can store 7592 thousand cubic meters of water. The construction of the dam was completed in 1952.

References

Dams in Yamanashi Prefecture
1952 establishments in Japan